Amcinafal (developmental code name SQ-15102), also known as triamcinolone pentanonide, is a synthetic glucocorticoid corticosteroid which was never marketed.

References

Corticosteroid cyclic ketals
Diketones
Diols
Fluoroarenes
Glucocorticoids
Pentanonides
Pregnanes